Coleophora svenssoni is a moth of the family Coleophoridae. It is found in Lapland, the Alps and the Carpathian Mountains.

The larvae feed on Astragalus alpinus, Astragalus frigidus, Hedysarum hedysaroides and Oxytropis halleri. They create a very untidy greenish yellow to brownish lobe case of 6–8 mm. The rear end is strongly curved downwards. The mouth angle is 0-10°.

References

svenssoni
Moths of Europe
Moths described in 1985